Veronica's Room is a theatrical play by Ira Levin (an author best known for Rosemary's Baby), originally mounted in 1973.  Because identifying the characters by name would spoil the plot of the play for audience members, printed programs normally identify the four characters as Woman, Man, Girl, and Young Man, which are also the names used for them in the script.

Plot

A middle-aged Irish couple, John and Maureen Mackey, bring a young couple, Susan and Larry, to the suburban Boston home where the Mackeys are caretakers.  Susan and Larry have recently begun to date, and the Mackeys approached them at a restaurant due to Susan's resemblance to a dead woman, Veronica.  The Mackeys explain that Veronica's elderly, senile sister, Cissie, is now their charge, and Susan agrees to dress up as Veronica in an effort to bring Cissie a sense of closure.  The year is 1973, but Cissie believes it to be 1935.  Larry and the Mackeys leave Susan alone in Veronica's preserved bedroom to change into a period outfit.

The older couple return with completely different appearances and personalities; they appear about twenty years younger and now have Boston accents.  They treat the young woman as if she were Veronica, and they represent themselves as her parents, Lloyd and Nedra. They accuse her of having murdered Cissie after Cissie discovered (and threatened to reveal) Veronica's incestuous relationship with their younger brother, Conrad.  They also maintain that it is 1935.  When the young woman stands by her identity as Susan from 1973, Lloyd and Nedra regard her as insane and call for the family physician, Dr. Simpson.  When he arrives, the young woman recognises him as Larry.  The young woman is ultimately broken; she acknowledges that she is Veronica and she confesses to Veronica's misdeeds.  Nedra then leads the others in murdering her.

It is revealed that the older man and woman are in fact Veronica and Conrad, while the younger man is their son, "Boy."  This is not the first time the three have carried out such a murder, nor will it be the last; Boy brings Veronica and Conrad young women who resemble Veronica, so that Veronica can experience murdering herself as a catharsis. They give the bodies to Boy, a necrophiliac, to do with as he wishes. Veronica is left alone in her room.

Productions

In the original Broadway production in 1973, Eileen Heckart played the Woman, Arthur Kennedy played the Man, Regina Baff played the Girl, and Kipp Osborne played the Young Man. Set design was done by Douglas W. Schmidt, assisted by John Lee Beatty, and won a Drama Desk Award for Outstanding Set Design.
<p>
An Off-Broadway revival opened at the Provincetown Playhouse on March 8, 1981 and ran for 97 performances. The production was directed by Arthur Savage and was performed by Georgine Hall (The Woman), Innes-Fergus McDade (The Girl), John Milligan (The Man) and Claude-Albert Saucier (The Young Man). For this revival, the placement of the intermission was moved up slightly from its original placement to add greater suspense.

References

External links
 

Plays by Ira Levin
1973 plays
Broadway plays
Horror plays